Delta Zeta (also known as DZ) is an international college sorority founded on October 24, 1902, at Miami University in Oxford, Ohio.

Delta Zeta has 170 collegiate chapters in the United States and Canada, and over 200 alumnae chapters in Canada, the United Kingdom and the United States. As of 2013, there are over 244,400 college and alumnae members, making it the third largest sorority in the nation (after Alpha Delta Pi and Chi Omega). In 1954, the sorority adopted speech and hearing as its philanthropic cause, and is partnered with the Starkey Hearing Foundation and Gallaudet University. Throughout its history, it has absorbed several other smaller sororities and also opened its first Canadian chapter in 1992.

Delta Zeta is one of 26 national sororities which are members under the umbrella organization of the National Panhellenic Conference; the sorority joined the Conference in 1910.

History 

Delta Zeta Sorority was founded at Miami University in Oxford, Ohio in 1902, the same year that the university first allowed female students. Miami is dubbed the "Mother of Fraternities" because of the many prominent men's fraternities which were founded there.

Six of the newly admitted women consulted university president Dr. Guy Potter Benton regarding the founding of the first sorority chapter. Having been a leader in the Phi Delta Theta fraternity, he was familiar with the processes of a Greek organization and helped the women establish the first Delta Zeta chapter, the first sorority at the campus. Benton aided in preparation of the ritual, badge, and colors. For his contributions, he was named the 'Grand Patron'. The Delta Zeta Sorority was officially incorporated on October 24, 1902. The founding members were: 
Alfa Lloyd Hayes
Mary Jane Collins
Anna Louise Keen
Julia Lawrence Bishop
Mabelle May Minton
Anne Dial Simmons.

The women were harassed for wanting to form a sorority. In one account, someone stole the constitution out of the secretary's hand but Dr. Benton pursued the offender and retrieved the constitution.

The first National Assembly, with Lloyd as the national president, was held in 1907.

In 1910, Delta Zeta published the first issue of its national magazine, The LAMP, now issued three times a year. That same year, the sorority joined the National Panhellenic Conference.

Throughout the middle of the century, Delta Zeta absorbed four other sororities: Beta Phi Alpha in 1941, Phi Omega Pi in 1946, Delta Sigma Epsilon in 1956, and Theta Upsilon in 1962; most of these sororities had previously absorbed other, smaller sororities as well.

In 1992, Delta Zeta chartered its first Canadian chapter at the University of Windsor, marking the beginning of the sorority's international expansion.

Symbols 
Delta Zeta's official flower is the pink Killarney rose, while the official stone is the diamond. The turtle is the official mascot. The Roman lamp is the official symbol. The badge consists of a lamp on top of a winged Ionic column, all in gold, with a diamond set at the spout of the lamp and four pearls inset on the capital of the column. The Greek letters are inscribed on the lamp. At its inception, the original badge did not include pearls, which were added a few years later.

The sorority's official colors are rose and green. The 1905 Baird's Manual lists the colors as "old rose and nile green" which some chapter websites used as of 2018. The 1991 edition says "old rose and green". However, the official national web site lists the colors as "rose and green".

Delta Zeta is one of the first sororities to have had a Lilly Pulitzer print made with its symbols.

The Delta Zeta Foundation 
The Delta Zeta Foundation is a not-for-profit entity within the organization that provides various scholarships for members of the sorority as well as funding leadership, philanthropy and education programs. There is a national philanthropic organization for active members of Delta Zeta known as the 1902 Loyalty Society, and members join by donating $19.02.

Membership

Current National Council 

The National Council of Delta Zeta is an alumnae board tasked with the governance of the organization.

Notable alumnae 

 Mercedes Bates (Chi) – first female corporate officer of General Mills Foods. After being appointed to head the Betty Crocker division, she was often referred to as "Betty Crocker".
 Shelley Berkley (Iota Phi) –  U.S. Representative for Nevada's 1st congressional district
 Marti Dodson (Theta) – lead singer for national recording artist, Saving Jane
 Nanette Fabray (Xi Omicron) – actress, worked to bring sign language and captioning to television
 Edith Head (Alumna Initiate, Mu) – Emmy Award-winning designer; 7-time Oscar winner in costume design
 Florence Henderson (Alumna Initiate, Alpha Chi – Honorary Member) – actress (The Brady Bunch)
 Helen Johnston – physician, clubwoman based in Des Moines, Iowa
 Princess Märtha of Sweden (Alumna Initiate, Upsilon) – princess of Sweden, crown princess of Norway.
 Maurine Brown Neuberger (Omega) – former US Senator
 Melissa Ordway (Delta Delta) – actress and model
 Gail Patrick (Alpha Pi) — actress, executive producer of the Perry Mason television series; vice president of the first board of directors of the Delta Zeta Foundation; $1 million bequest established the Women of Distinction Program.
 Ivy Baker Priest (Alpha Chi) – Former United States Treasurer
 Pat Priest (Alpha Chi) – actress, (The Munsters)
Rebecca Rusch (Alpha Beta) - professional athlete 
 Galadriel Stineman (Kappa Beta) – actress
 Marcia Wallace (Delta Nu) – TV and stage actress
 Kay Yow (Zeta Lambda) – women's  basketball Coach, NC State

Collegiate chapters 

Delta Zeta has 170 collegiate chapters in the United States and Canada and over 200 alumnae chapters in Canada, the United Kingdom, and the United States.

Controversies 

At the end of 2006, the Delta Chapter of Delta Zeta at DePauw University became enmeshed in a controversy that would eventually make national headlines and result in the chapter's closure. The Delta Zeta national leadership was criticized after The New York Times published an article accusing the National office of moving certain members of the Delta Chapter at DePauw University to alumnae status based on their perceived attractiveness. Founded in 1909, the Delta chapter was the sorority's second oldest active chapter and its fourth oldest chapter overall (a "single letter" chapter). Despite its long history at DePauw, the Delta Zeta chapter struggled with declining membership and had acquired a negative reputation on campus. As a result, the Delta chapter members voted to request Delta Zeta Sorority to close the chapter due to falling numbers and lack of interest in recruitment. When notified of the chapter decision,  Delta Zeta Sorority arranged a chapter membership review and chapter reorganization rather than close the chapter completely. Several of the members that were moved to alumnae status (and therefore required to move out of the Delta Zeta house at DePauw) argued that they were moved to alumnae status due to their perceived unattractiveness, weight, or ethnicity and contacted the media.

See also 
List of social fraternities and sororities

References 

 
Student organizations established in 1902
International student societies
National Panhellenic Conference
Miami University
1902 establishments in Ohio